Kim R. Holmes (born 1952) is an author and former American diplomat and Assistant Secretary of State. From 2002 to 2005 he served as the United States Assistant Secretary of State for International Organization Affairs; he was also Executive Vice-President of the Heritage Foundation, having served twice as the foundation’s Vice President of Foreign and Defense Policy Studies and Director of its Kathryn and Shelby Cullom Davis Institute for International Studies between 1992 and 2012.

Career 
Holmes was a senior fellow at the Institute for Foreign Policy Analysis, a research institute associated with the Fletcher School of Law and Diplomacy, and was a research fellow at the Institute for European History in Mainz, Germany. Holmes first joined the Heritage Foundation in 1985. While at Heritage, he was promoted to senior policy analyst for national security affairs specializing in arms control, NATO, and East-West strategic relations. He was subsequently promoted to director — and in 1992, vice president — of foreign and defense policy studies. He served in that position until 2001, and again from 2005 to 2012.

In 1995, Holmes and the Heritage Foundation authored a report advocating for an increase in funds towards ensuring the nation's defense against ballistic missiles, stating that "the threat of ballistic missile attack is clear, present, and growing."

Holmes served as founding editor of the Heritage Foundation/Wall Street Journal's annual Index of Economic Freedom, serving as co-editor from 1995 through 2002 and from 2006 through 2014. In September 2000, he testified before Congress on national missile defense. In 2002, Holmes served as Assistant Secretary of State for International Organization Affairs under Secretary of State Colin Powell, a position he held until 2005. Later in 2005, he testified before Congress about human rights issues in Cuba, and U.N. peacekeeping abuses in the Democratic Republic of the Congo.

Holmes later served on presidential candidate Mitt Romney’s Foreign Policy and National Security Advisory Team in 2012. Also in 2012, Holmes became a Distinguished Fellow at The Heritage Foundation.

Holmes has been a member of the board of directors and executive committee for the Center for International Private Enterprise, associated with the U.S. Chamber of Commerce, since 2016, and a board member since 1997.

On August 1, 2019 Holmes was confirmed by the Senate to be a member of the National Council on the Humanities.

Works

References

External links
 Official biography and list of publications
 Official biography, U.S. Department of State
 Articles, The Washington Times
 

1952 births
Living people
University of Central Florida alumni
Georgetown University alumni
The Heritage Foundation
George W. Bush administration personnel
United States Assistant Secretaries of State